Rancho Huichica was a   Mexican land grant in present day Napa County, California given in 1841  to Jacob P. Leese.  Carneros Creek forms the northeast boundary of Rancho Huichica, and the grant contains the majority of the Carneros region in Napa Valley.

History
Leese was a San Francisco pioneer who built the first permanent house in San Francisco.  He married General Vallejo’s sister, and moved to Sonoma in 1841.  In 1841 Manuel Jimeno, acting Governor of California, granted two square leagues to Leese, and in 1844 Governor Manuel Micheltorena granted Leese a three and a half leagues extension. 

With the cession of California to the United States following the Mexican-American War, the 1848 Treaty of Guadalupe Hidalgo provided that the land grants would be honored.  As required by the Land Act of 1851, a claim for Rancho Huichica was filed with the Public Land Commission in 1852, and the grant was patented to Jacob P. Leese in 1859.

Winter Winery
In the mid-1850s, William H. Winter of Indiana purchased  of the Rancho Huichica  from Leese.  The first winery in Carneros, Winter Winery was then established during the early 1870s. Beginning in the 1880s Phylloxera devastated many of the vineyards in the Carneros region.  The Winter Winery was sold in 1881 to James Simonton who changed the name to Talcoa Vineyards. Simonton became the first to experiment scientifically, under the direction of Missouri viticulturist George Husmann, to find Phylloxera-resistant rootstock.

Gundlach-Bundschu
Around 1857 Jacob Gundlach and Emil Dresel purchased  of Rancho Huichica.  Jacob Gundlach, the son of a Bavarian hotel keeper, came to California in 1850 at age 33, lured by the promise of gold. He became successful making beer, founding the Bavarian Brewery of San Francisco. Sometime after 1851 he became associated with Emil Dresel, an architect from Geisenheim, Germany.  Around 1857 Gundlach and Dresel purchased  of Rancho Huichica, named it Rhinefarm, and turned to winemaking. In 1864, Charles Bundschu came from Germany to work for Gundlach, and married Gundlach's daughter. Dresel and Gundlach separated their operation sometime after 1869, and in 1894 the firm of J. Gundlach & Co. became Gundlach Bundschu.

See also
Ranchos of California
List of Ranchos of California

References

 

Huichica
Huichica